Márcio Rafael Ferreira de Souza (born 7 September 1985), commonly known as Rafinha ("Little Rafa"), is a Brazilian professional footballer who plays as a right-back for São Paulo. He is known as a skilled defender with good passing skills, quick pace, agility and a strong shot. He has earned four caps with the Brazil national team. Since 2015, he has the German citizenship.

Club career

Brazil and Schalke

Rafinha began his football career at the age of seven, playing for Gremio Londrinense, a futsal team from his home town of Londrina, Paraná. By age 12, he had begun training with PSTC, a local football club, before signing for Londrina Esporte Clube in 2000 at the age of 15. At the end of his second year with Londrina, Rafinha was signed by Coritiba. This meant moving hundreds of kilometers from his home town, but it also allowed Rafinha to display his talents on the national stage. For Coritiba, Rafinha made 23 appearances in the 2004 season and scored three goals in 13 appearances in the 2005 season.

At Coritiba, Rafinha eventually found his way into the Brazil under-20 national team and played in the 2005 FIFA World Youth Championship in the Netherlands. During the tournament, he scored two goals and played an integral part in Brazil's progress to the bronze medal. Rafinha's performance at the tournament alerted numerous European teams to his ability, with German club Schalke 04 ultimately signing the right-back from Coritiba for an estimated €5 million on a four-year contract. At Schalke, he made 42 appearances in 2005–06 season, two goals in 35 appearances in the 2006–07 season, five goals in 46 appearances in the 2007–08 season, two goals in 40 appearances in the 2008–09 season, and two goals in 35 appearances in the 2009–10 season.

Genoa
On 4 August 2010, it was confirmed that Rafinha moved from Schalke to Italian side Genoa. The transfer had cost Genoa €8 million. He scored two goals in 34 appearances in his only Serie A season. After Genoa had failed to pay the transfer fee in time, however, Rafinha's former club Schalke sued Genoa through the Court of Arbitration for Sport (CAS).

Bayern Munich

On 1 June 2011, Bayern Munich confirmed Rafinha's transfer from Genoa on the same day that they signed his former Schalke teammate Manuel Neuer. Rafinha signed a three-year contract, and reports say Bayern paid €5.75 million for him. He scored his first goal for Bayern against Villarreal, as a substitute in a 2–0 UEFA Champions League win on 14 September 2011. He finished the 2011–12 season with a goal in 35 appearances. Entering as an 83rd-minute substitute on 20 October 2012 during an away match against Fortuna Düsseldorf, he scored his first Bundesliga goal for Bayern in a 5–0 win. He played a total of 13 Bundesliga games throughout the season, adding another goal on 13 April in a 4–0 win over 1. FC Nürnberg. He finished the 2012–13 season with two goals in 17 appearances.

During the 2013–14 season, after fellow right back Philipp Lahm was moved to defensive midfield, Rafinha found more opportunities to play regularly. He made 46 appearances across all competitions, including the entire DFB-Pokal Final in which Bayern secured a second consecutive double after defeating Borussia Dortmund.

He finished the 2014–15 season with 41 appearances.

He started the 2015–16 season by coming in as a substitute for Robert Lewandowski in the 72nd minute of the German Super Cup. He finished the 2015–16 season with 34 appearances.

He started the 2016–17 season by coming in as a substitute for Thomas Müller in the 87th minute of the German Super Cup. He finished the 2016–17 season with a goal in 28 appearances.

He started the 2017–18 season by starting in the German Super Cup. He finished the 2017–18 season with a goal in 39 appearances.

Rafinha was an unused substitute in the German Super Cup. He made his first appearance of the 2018–19 season in the German Cup. He started the match and played the full 90 minutes. He finished the 2018–19 season with a goal in 26 appearances.

Flamengo
On 9 June 2019, Flamengo confirmed Rafinha's transfer from Bayern Munich. Rafinha signed a two-year contract.

Olympiacos
On 23 August 2020, Rafinha joined Olympiacos after signing a one-plus-one-year contract. He was officially released on 2 February 2021, as he was no longer in the plans of manager Pedro Martins, especially after signing right full-back Kenny Lala as a free transfer a few days earlier. Although, before the mutual termination of his contract, he won the Greek Cup and alongside, Olympiacos set an agreement that, after winning that season's Super League Greece, Rafinha will get a commemorative medal for that title.

Grêmio
On 29 March 2021, Rafinha joined Grêmio on a deal running until December.

International career

Brazil

U-23 (2008 Olympics)

In the summer of 2008, Rafinha was involved in a dispute with his club about his participation for Brazil at the 2008 Beijing Olympic Games.

Schalke 04 (to send Rafinha) along with Werder Bremen (Diego) and Barcelona (Lionel Messi) did not want to release their players for the Olympic games so that they could help them in their domestic and European competitions. The case was taken to FIFA, which ruled that all clubs should release their players aged under 23 for the Games.

Schalke, Werder Bremen and Barcelona, however, took their case to the Court of Arbitration for Sport (CAS) who eventually ruled in the clubs' favour, stating, "The Court of Arbitration for Sport (CAS) has upheld the appeals filed by FC Schalke 04, SV Werder Bremen and FC Barcelona against the decision issued on 30 July 2008 by the Single Judge of the FIFA's Players' Status Committee that consequently has been set aside in its entirety."

Schalke continued its bar on Rafinha from attending the Olympics. Despite his club's wishes, however, he ultimately did compete for the Brazil squad, which won bronze.

Senior team
Rafinha made his senior debut for Brazil on 26 March 2008 in a friendly match against Sweden. He then went through a six-year absence from the national team, making his second appearance in a friendly against South Africa on 5 March 2014. In May 2014, he was named by Brazil head coach Luiz Felipe Scolari as a standby player for the 2014 FIFA World Cup.

On 17 September 2015, Rafinha was called up by head coach Dunga for two qualifying fixtures for the 2018 World Cup, but five days later turned it down, while also denying claims of rejecting the call-up to represent his adopted homeland Germany.

In June 2017, Rafinha was called up for international friendlies against Argentina and Australia.

Career statistics

Club

International

Honours

Club
Bayern Munich
 Bundesliga: 2012–13, 2013–14, 2014–15, 2015–16, 2016–17, 2017–18, 2018–19
 DFB-Pokal: 2012–13, 2013–14, 2015–16, 2018–19
 DFL-Supercup: 2012, 2016, 2017, 2018
 UEFA Champions League: 2012–13
 UEFA Super Cup: 2013
 FIFA Club World Cup: 2013

Flamengo
 Campeonato Brasileiro Série A: 2019, 2020
Supercopa do Brasil: 2020
Campeonato Carioca: 2020
 Copa Libertadores: 2019
Recopa Sudamericana: 2020
FIFA Club World Cup runner-up: 2019

Olympiacos
Super League Greece: 2020–21
 Greek Football Cup: 2019–20

Grêmio
Campeonato Gaúcho: 2021
Recopa Gaúcha: 2021

São Paulo
Copa Sudamericana runner-up: 2022

Individual
Campeonato Brasileiro Série A Team of the Year: 2019
Bola de Prata: 2019
Campeonato Carioca Team of the Year: 2020

References

External links

 
 

1985 births
Living people
Sportspeople from Londrina
Brazilian footballers
German footballers
Brazilian emigrants to Germany
Naturalized citizens of Germany
Association football defenders
Coritiba Foot Ball Club players
FC Schalke 04 players
Genoa C.F.C. players
FC Bayern Munich footballers
CR Flamengo footballers
Olympiacos F.C. players
Grêmio Foot-Ball Porto Alegrense players
São Paulo FC players
Campeonato Brasileiro Série A players
Bundesliga players
Serie A players
Super League Greece players
Copa Libertadores-winning players
UEFA Champions League winning players
Brazil youth international footballers
Brazil under-20 international footballers
Olympic footballers of Brazil
Brazil international footballers
Footballers at the 2008 Summer Olympics
Olympic medalists in football
Medalists at the 2008 Summer Olympics
Olympic bronze medalists for Brazil
Brazilian expatriate footballers
German expatriate footballers
Expatriate footballers in Italy
Expatriate footballers in Greece
Brazilian expatriate sportspeople in Italy
Brazilian expatriate sportspeople in Greece
German expatriate sportspeople in Italy
German expatriate sportspeople in Greece